General elections were held in Luxembourg on 28 September 1848. They were the first direct elections to the Chamber of Deputies. Doctrinaire Liberals, who had been in power since 1841, lost the election to progressive Liberals and Catholics who were supportive of the new constitution.

Electoral system
The elections were the first held after a new electoral law was passed on 23 July 1848, which established direct and secret elections. It also reduced the tax qualification from 10 florins to 10 francs. Although this doubled the number of voters from around 5,000 to 9,868, 95% of the population remained disenfranchised. They were also the first elections held under the 1848 constitution, which was based on the Belgian constitution and introduced a parliamentary system with a constitutional monarchy, limiting the powers of the Grand Duke.

Aftermath
Although the progressive Liberals and Catholics held a majority of seats, the accession of William III to the throne in 1849 reduced their power. William opposed the 1848 constitution, supported the doctrinaire Liberals and demanded that the full power of the monarchy be restored.

References

1848 elections in Europe
1848 in Luxembourg
1848
September 1848 events